Frevoador is the twelfth solo album by Brazilian musician Zé Ramalho. It was released in 1992, after a four-year gap with no albums. When promoting his next album Cidades e Lendas, he said he wasn't satisfied with the final result of Frevoador, suggesting the repertoire and the session musicians weren't the right ones.

Track listing

Personnel 
 Zé Ramalho - Lead vocals, acoustic guitar, viola on track 10
 Waltel blanco - Acoustic guitar on track 9
 Geraldo Azevedo - Acoustic guitar on track 4, 8
 Rafael Rabello - Seven-string guitar on track 9
 Joel do Bandolim - Mandolin on track 9
 Chico Guedes - Bass guitar on tracks 1, 2, 4
 Mingo Araújo - Percussion
 Gustavo Schröeter - Drums
 Ricardo Rente - Saxophone on track 1, Flute on track 3, soprano saxophone on track 8
 Ciro Telles - Piano, keyboard 
 Marcos de Lima - Keyboard on tracks 1, 7, piano on tracks 5, 6
 Júlio Silva - Electric guitar on track 1, 6, 7, twelve-string guitar on track 2, 5
 Felipe Freire - Electric guitar on track 2, 3
 André Araújo - Violin
 Genaro - Accordion on tracks 5, 10
 Franklin - Flute on track 9
 Gílson de Freitas - Pandeiro on track 9

References

1992 albums
Zé Ramalho albums
Columbia Records albums